St. Bartholomew’s or Barts may refer to:

 St. Bartholomew's Church (disambiguation)

Hospitals
 St Bartholomew's Hospital, Bristol, founded 1240
 St Bartholomew's Hospital, City of London,  founded 1123
 St. Bartholomew's Hospital, Rochester, founded 1078

Other uses
 Barts and The London School of Medicine and Dentistry, a medical and dental school, part of Queen Mary University of London
 St. Bartholomew's School in Newbury, Berkshire, England

See also
 Barts Health NHS Trust
 Saint Barthélemy an island in the Caribbean's French West Indies, often called St. Barts 
 St. Bartholomew, was one of the twelve apostles of Jesus Christ.
 Covenham St Bartholomew, a village in Lincolnshire, England, United Kingdom
 St. Bartholomew's Day Massacre or Massacre de la Saint-Barthélemy (1572)
 Saint-Barthélemy (disambiguation)
 Bartholomew (disambiguation)